Agallia lingula is a species of leafhopper in the family Cicadellidae.

References

Further reading

 
 

Insects described in 1907
Megophthalminae